Lucio Serrani (born 11 March 1961) is a retired male hammer thrower from Italy.

Biography
He twice competed for his native country at the Summer Olympics: in 1984 and 1988. Serrani set his personal best (78.02 metres) in the men's hammer throw event in 1988.

Achievements

See also
 Italian all-time lists - Hammer throw

External links
 

1961 births
Living people
Italian male hammer throwers
Athletes (track and field) at the 1984 Summer Olympics
Athletes (track and field) at the 1988 Summer Olympics
Olympic athletes of Italy
Universiade medalists in athletics (track and field)
World Athletics Championships athletes for Italy
Mediterranean Games gold medalists for Italy
Mediterranean Games medalists in athletics
Athletes (track and field) at the 1987 Mediterranean Games
Universiade bronze medalists for Italy
Medalists at the 1987 Summer Universiade